Sandy Adel Ahmed Hussein is an Egyptian singer.

Career

Career beginnings
Sandy began her solo singing career in 2006 with the release of "كل ما أقرب" ("Whatever is closer"). In 2009 she released the song "شوفته وماكلمنيش" which increased her popularity, it was written and composed by Mohammed Rifai Husam Badran and released with the album titled سولو هيتس 1 (Solo Hits 1).

She released a second album لسة صغيرة ("Still young") then a third, قد التحدي,

Revolution in Egypt 2011
After the events of the revolution of January 25th 2011 in Egypt, Sandy presented the first national song for Egypt entitled "ولاد النيل" (the sons of the Nile). She later went on to film the videoclip in Paris "الحلم" (The Dream) from the album قد التحدي  (the challenge) with the British director Eric Carlson (the photograph was in black and white) and she released the video for "عايزة اقولك" (I want to tell you).

Latest activity
The singer announced her retiring from the music business on social networks with respect to her personal life and health reasons; After releasing her fifth album entitled Hob (Love) in 2015. However, two years after, December 2017, the singer became active again with another song entitled "Maghnatis" (Magnetic) under Glitch Records in collaboration with Pause Production, announcing them as her new music label. Finally, the performer released her sixth album, Ĕtnin fi wahda, in January 2020. The album, in which she collaborated with new producers and poets such as Mido Munib, also contains a song produced and written by Sandy herself. Sandy also plays a character in two movies: Jimm's Plan (2014) and Live Your Life (2019).

Discography
 2006 – كل ما أقرب (Kol ma árab) "Everything nearest"
 2009 – لسه صغيره (Lesa saghirah) "Still young"
 2010 – قد التحدي (Ád altaħdi) "up to the challenge"
 2012 – احسن من كتير (Aħsan min katir) "Better than many"
 2016 – حب (Hob) "Love"
 2020 – إتنين في واحدة (Ĕtnin fi wahda) "Two in one"

Music videos
 كل ما أقرب "Everything closer" (Director: Tamer Bassiouni)
 شوفته وماكلمنيش "Hovth and Makelmenah" (Director: Younis)
 هموت عليك "Hmut you" (from the album: Little Lessa) (Director: Younis)
 هموت عليك – ريمكس "Hmut you – remix" (from the album: Little Lessa) (Director: Younis)
 خربت مالطا "Remembering Malta" (from the album: Little Lessa) (Director: Younis)
 إياك "Warning" (Album: Little Lessa) (Director: Yasser Al-Najjar)
 ابن جارتنا "Son of our neighbor" (from the album: Little Lessa) (Director: Taha Tunisia)
 حصل خير "It got better" (Album: You can dispute) (Director: David Zennie)
 الحلم "Dream" (directed by: Eric Carlson)
 ماتحملت الزعل "Mathmmelt Azaal" produced by Rotana (Director: Fabiaewman)
 عايزة اقولك "Ayza Acolk" (production: the voice of the delta) (Director: David Zannie)
 أحسن من كتير "Better Kteer" (production: the voice of the delta) (Director: David Zannie)
 محبطة "Frustrating" (production: the Delta sound)
 Sandy – Never Give Up / ساندي – عمري مايئست

Personal life
She married the composer Husam Badran in 2009 and she separated from him in 2017 and married the director Hazem Kattana.

References

External links
 
 

Living people
1986 births
21st-century Egyptian women singers
Singers from Cairo
Egyptian singer-songwriters
Singers who perform in Egyptian Arabic